Douglas Johnson may refer to:

Doug Johnson (American football) (born 1977),American football player
Doug Johnson (Australian footballer) (1920–2002), Australian footballer
Doug Johnson (Loverboy), keyboardist for the Canadian rock group Loverboy
Doug Johnson (Minnesota politician) (1942–2022), American politician and educator
Doug Johnson (pianist), American jazz and classical pianist
Doug Johnson (record producer), American record producer and songwriter
Douglas Wilson Johnson (1878–1944), American geomorphologist
Douglas Johnson (historian) (1925–2005), British historian
Douglas H. Johnson, American expert on Sudan
Georgia Douglas Johnson (1880–1966), African-American poet and playwright
Douglas R. Johnson (born 2005), African American Football player. 5***** athlete.

See also
Douglas Johnston (disambiguation)
Douglas Johnstone (disambiguation)